The British National Cyclo-cross Championships are held annually. The winners of each event are awarded with a symbolic white cycling jersey featuring blue and red stripes, which can be worn by the rider at other cyclo-cross  events in the country to show their status as national champion. The champion's stripes can be combined into a sponsored rider's team kit design for this purpose.

Men

Elite

Under 23

Junior

Women

Elite

Under 23

Junior

References

External links
Men's past winners on cyclingwebsite.net

Cycle racing in the United Kingdom
National cyclo-cross championships
National championships in the United Kingdom
Annual sporting events in the United Kingdom